Claude Edward Harvey (born March 27, 1948) is a former American football linebacker. 

Harvey was born in Willis, Texas, in 1948. He played college football at Prairie View A&M from 1966 to 1969. 

Harvey played professional football in the National Football League (NFL) for the Houston Oilers. He appeared in a total of five NFL games. He was released by the Oilers in September 1971.

References

1948 births
Living people
American football linebackers
Houston Oilers players
Prairie View A&M Panthers football players
Players of American football from Texas
People from Willis, Texas